Gökhan Keskin (born 31 March 1966 in Istanbul) is a retired Turkish professional footballer. He played for Beşiktaş and İstanbulspor.

Club career
Keskin spent seventeen seasons in the Süper Lig with Beşiktaş and İstanbulspor

International career
Keskin made 41 appearances for the full Turkey national football team.

Individual
Beşiktaş J.K. Squads of Century (Golden Team)

References

External links
 

1966 births
Living people
Turkish footballers
Turkey international footballers
Beşiktaş J.K. footballers
İstanbulspor footballers
Association football defenders